Jamesiella dacryoidea is a thin, translucent grey-colored, teardrop-shaped lichen species that is differentiated from other species of Jamesiella by its color and shape. This lichen grows on rocks near bodies of saltwater, typically on top of bryophytes. Jamesiella dacryoidea is found on the southeast coast of Alaska and was discovered in Petersburg Borough, Alaska.  This species is named after its teardrop shape, as dacryoideus in Latin means tear-shaped.

Description 
Jamesiella dacryoidea has a broad, flat body with a pointed or rounded tip and transparent, grey-green, and then brown  coloration.  The hyphae of this lichen are located in parallel with the meristem.   This lichen also contains photosynthetic green algae within the thallus and between the hyphae.

References  

Lichen species
Lichens described in 2021
Lichens of Subarctic America
Ostropales